Dario Vidošević (13 April 1968 – 27 May 2020) was a Croatian rowing coxswain. He competed in the men's coxed pair event at the 1984 Summer Olympics.

References

External links
 

1968 births
2020 deaths
Croatian male rowers
Olympic rowers of Yugoslavia
Rowers at the 1984 Summer Olympics
Rowers from Split, Croatia
Coxswains (rowing)